Suzan Lee Pitt (July 11, 1943 – June 16, 2019) was an American film animator and painter, whose surreal, psychological animated films and paintings have been acclaimed and exhibited worldwide.

Early life
Pitt was born in Kansas City, Missouri, and studied painting at the Cranbrook Academy of Art, graduating with a BFA in 1965. In the late 1960s, based in New York, Pitt began experimenting with cutout animation using an 8 mm camera, completing her first short film Bowl, Garden, Theatre, Marble Game in 1970.

Animation
Her best-known film, Asparagus, took four years to make, and debuted as part of an installation at the Whitney Museum of American Art in 1979. The installation included the movie-theater set piece used in the film, which held an audience of 15 people. Asparagus also screened with David Lynch's Eraserhead for two years on the midnight movie circuit.

Throughout the 1980s Pitt designed animated projections for various theatrical projects, in particular two groundbreaking operas in Germany: The Magic Flute for the Staatstheater Wiesbaden in 1983 and The Damnation of Faust for the Staatsoper Hamburg in 1988. In addition, she created large-scale multimedia shows, including a collaboration with John Cage at Harvard University in 1976 and at the Venice Biennale in 1980.

Pitt's honors include a Guggenheim Fellowship in 2000, a Creative Capital Moving Image Award in 2005, a Rockefeller Fellowship, and three production grants from the National Endowment for the Arts. She received a retrospective screening at the Museum of Modern Art in 2017, and a Lifetime Achievement Award at Animafest Zagreb in 2019.

Fashion
In 1984 and again in 2016, Pitt created editions of hand-painted coats, sold through designer Patricia Field. Pitt also created silk-screen T-shirts printed with an original design, sold through WilliWear Productions by Willi Smith in 1984.

Teaching
Pitt was an associate professor at the Carpenter Center for the Visual Arts at Harvard from 1988 through the early 1990s. Starting in 1998, she taught in the Experimental Animation program at the California Institute of the Arts for nearly twenty years, living in Los Angeles and Taos, New Mexico.

Preservation
The Academy Film Archive has preserved several of Pitt's films, including Joy Street, Asparagus, Whitney Commercial, Crocus, and Bowl, Garden, Theatre, Marble Game.

Filmography
Bowl, Garden, Theatre, Marble Game – 1970 (16mm, color, 7 min.)
Crocus – 1971 (16mm, color, 7 min.)
A City Trip – 1972 (16mm, color, 3 min.)
Cels – 1972 (16mm, color, 6 min.)
Whitney Commercial – 1973 (16mm, color, 3 min.)
Jefferson Circus Songs – 1973 (16mm, color, 16 min.)
Asparagus – 1979 (35mm, color, 18 min.)
Joy Street – 1995 (35mm, color, 24 min.)
El Doctor – 2006 (35mm, color, 23 min.)
Visitation – 2011 (digital (from 16mm), b/w, 8 min 50 seconds.)
Pinball – 2013 (digital, color, 7 min.)

References

External links
Suzan Pitt official site
Suzan Pitt on Vimeo

Experimental Animation Faculty
Curator's Notes
Chicago Reader
Animation World Magazine, Issue 1.11, February 1997
Interview, Anima anime: Suzan Pitt’s Wild Psyches, British Film Institute

1943 births
2019 deaths
20th-century American women artists
21st-century American women artists
American animators
American animated film directors
American experimental filmmakers
American surrealist artists
American women experimental filmmakers
American women painters
Artists from Kansas City, Missouri
California Institute of the Arts faculty
Cranbrook Academy of Art alumni
Harvard University faculty
Surrealist filmmakers
American women animators
Women surrealist artists
American women academics